The 1942 Minnesota lieutenant gubernatorial election took place on November 3, 1942. Republican Party of Minnesota candidate Edward John Thye defeated Minnesota Farmer–Labor Party challenger Juls J. Anderson and Minnesota Democratic Party candidate Joseph Kowalkowski.

Results

External links
 Election Returns

Lieutenant Gubernatorial
1942

Minnesota